N'shei Chabad, also known as the Lubavitch Women's Organization, is a Hasidic women's organization associated with the Chabad-Lubavitch community. The group was initially titled Agudas N'shei U'bnos Chabad (Council of the Women and Daughters of Chabad, and was founded in New York City in 1955 by Rabbi Menachem Mendel Schneerson (1902-1994), the Rebbe of Chabad. The organization offered Chabad women the opportunity to take an active role in community life. The group published magazines, and organized conventions to promote Hasidic outreach work.

Chapters 
In 1980, the N'shei Chabad had chapters in over 160 cities around the world, including close to 50 in Israel and close to 90 in the United States.

See also 
 Chabad organizations

References 

Chabad organizations
Women's religious organizations
Jewish organizations established in 1955
Jewish women's organizations